Mixed-precision arithmetic is a form of floating-point arithmetic that uses numbers with varying widths in a single operation.

Arithmetic
A common usage of mixed-precision arithmetic is for operating on inaccurate numbers with a small width and expanding them to a larger, more accurate representation. For example, two half-precision or bfloat16 (16-bit) floating-point numbers may be multiplied together to result in a more accurate single-precision (32-bit) float. In this way, mixed-precision arithmetic approximates arbitrary-precision arithmetic, albeit with a low number of possible precisions.

Mixed-precision arithmetic is touted in the field of machine learning, since gradient descent algorithms can use coarse and efficient half-precision floats for certain tasks, but can be more accurate if they use more precise but slower single- or double-precision floats. Some platforms, including Nvidia and AMD GPUs, provide mixed-precision arithmetic for this purpose, using coarse floats when possible, but expanding them to higher precision when necessary.

Iterative algorithms (like gradient descent) are good candidates for mixed-precision arithmetic. In an iterative algorithm like square root, a coarse integral guess can be made and refined over many iterations until the error in precision makes it such that the smallest addition or subtraction to the guess is still too coarse to be an acceptable answer. When this happens, the precision can be increased to something more precise, which allows for smaller increments to be used for the approximation.

Supercomputers such as Summit utilize mixed-precision arithmetic to be more efficient with regards to memory and processing time, as well as power consumption.

References

Floating point
Computer arithmetic